This is a list of all articles related to geology that cannot be readily placed on the following subtopic pages:

 Geologic time scale
 List of compounds
 Lists of earthquakes
 List of elements by name
 Geology of the English counties
 List of geologists
 List of landforms
 List of minerals
 List of minerals by optical properties
 List of oil fields
 List of plate tectonics topics
 List of rock types
 List of tectonic plates
 List of volcanoes

A 
 Asthenosphere
 Astrogeology
 Aulacogen

B 
 Batholith
 Beach
 Bolide

C 
 Calcium
 Canyon
 Cave
 Cement
 Cementation
 Cenozoic
 Coast
 Concretion
 Conglomerate
 Continent
 Convergent boundary
 Crag and tail
 Crust

D 
 Datum (geodesy)
 Deposition
 Dike
 Divergent boundary
 Drumlin

E 
 Earth science
 Environmental engineering
 Environmental geography
 Eon
 Epigenesis
 Epoch
 Era
 Eustasy

F 
 Fahlband
 Fall line
 Felsic

G 
 Geologic age
 Geologic fault
 Geologic modeling
 Geologic period
 Geologic time scale
 Geological phenomenon
 Geologist
 Geology of the Alps
 Geomorphology
 Geostatistics
 Geyser
 Glaciation
 Graben

H 
 Horst (geology)
 Hotspot (geology)

I 
 Igneous rock
 Isostasy

K 
 Karst

L 
 Laccolith
 List of geologists
 List of tectonic plates
 List of rock types
 Lithosphere
 Lithotope

M 
 Mafic
 Mantle (geology)
 Mass wasting
 Matrix (geology)
 Metamorphic rock
 Meteorite
 Mineral
 Mining engineering
 Mud pot
 Mud volcano

N

O 
 Orogeny

P 
 Paleontology
 Pedology (soil study)
 Permeability (fluid)
 Petroleum engineering
 Phosphate
 Piercement structure
 Plate tectonics
 Porphyry (geology)
 Proterozoic

Q

R 
 Regression (geology) 
 Relative density
 Rift (geology)
 Rock (geology)
 Rock strata
 Rodinia
 Rubidium-Strontium dating

S 
 Sand
 Sandstone
 Sediment trap
 Sedimentary rock
 Sequence stratigraphy
 Silicate minerals
 Sill
 Stratigraphy
 Subduction zone

T 
 Tar pit
 Tenham meteorites
 Timeline of geology
 Transform boundary
 Transgression (geology)

U 
 Uniformitarianism

V

W

X

Y

Z 

Indexes of science articles